Chidi Francis Iwuoma (born February 19, 1978) is a former American football cornerback who is currently a scout for BLESTO. He was signed by the Detroit Lions as an undrafted free agent in 2001. He played college football at California.

Iwuoma has also played in the National Football League (NFL) for the Pittsburgh Steelers, New England Patriots, St. Louis Rams and Tennessee Titans. He won Super Bowl XL over the Seattle Seahawks with the Steelers.

Early years
Iwuoma's parents were Nigerian immigrants. Chidi Iwuoma attended Pasadena High School in Pasadena, California. He then attended the University of California, Berkeley where he played football. At California, Iwuoma returned kicks and punts while also playing cornerback.

Chidi Iwuoma is a member of Iota Phi Theta fraternity.

Professional career

Detroit Lions
Iwuoma signed with the Detroit Lions as an undrafted free agent following the 2001 NFL Draft.

Pittsburgh Steelers
Iwuoma primarily played on special teams while with the Pittsburgh Steelers. He earned a Super Bowl ring with the Steelers following the 2005 season. Iwuoma was elected the special teams co-captain for two consecutive seasons. In 2006, he underwent shoulder surgery but returned in time for pre-season camp. During the pre-season he suffered a concussion and was released on September 6.

New England Patriots
Iwuoma signed with the New England Patriots on October 4, 2006. He was released on October 31.

St. Louis Rams
A few weeks after his release from the Patriots, Iwuoma signed with the St. Louis Rams on November 14. He was released again on November 28.

Return to Pittsburgh
On December 5, 2006, with four games remaining in the season, the Steelers re-signed Iwuoma. Iwuoma ended his 2006 season with the Steelers but dislocated his wrist. He was re-signed on March 16, 2007 as an unrestricted free agent. The Steelers waived Iwuoma as a final cut on September 2.

Tennessee Titans
He was signed by the Titans on December 26, 2007. He became an unrestricted free agent after the season.

After professional career
Iwuoma worked with the University of California's Athletic Study Center from 2009–2012, where he served as Assistant Director of Student-Athlete Development. In May 2013 he joined the Steelers as their designated BLESTO scout.

References

1978 births
Living people
Players of American football from Los Angeles
Players of American football from Pasadena, California
American sportspeople of Nigerian descent
Nigerian players of American football
American football cornerbacks
California Golden Bears football players
Detroit Lions players
Pittsburgh Steelers players
Tennessee Titans players
New England Patriots players
St. Louis Rams players
Pasadena High School (California) alumni